Daniel Knabb Hoch (January 31, 1866 – October 11, 1960) was a Democratic member of the U.S. House of Representatives from Pennsylvania.

Biography
Daniel Hoch was born on a farm near Reading, Pennsylvania.  He served a printing apprenticeship on a Reading newspaper and worked in various departments of the newspaper.  He was a member of the Pennsylvania State House of Representatives from 1899 to 1901, and a delegate to the Democratic National Convention in 1908.  He was controller of Berks County, PA from 1912 to 1916, and a trustee of St. Matthew's Lutheran Church since 1937.  He was elected as a Democrat to the 78th and 79th Congresses.  He was an unsuccessful candidate for reelection in 1946.

Sources

1866 births
1960 deaths
American Lutherans
Politicians from Reading, Pennsylvania
Democratic Party members of the Pennsylvania House of Representatives
Democratic Party members of the United States House of Representatives from Pennsylvania